Sentinel Project may refer to:
Sentinel Project for Genocide Prevention 
    Satellite Sentinel Project 
Sentinel (FBI)